Free Democrats may refer to:
Alliance of Free Democrats (Hungary)
Association of Free Democrats (East Germany)
Free Democrats of Arjeplog
Free Democrats (Armenia)
Free Democrats (Czech Republic)
Free Democrats (Italy)
Free Democrats (Norway)
Free Democrats (South Africa)
Movement of Free Democrats (Cyprus)
Our Georgia – Free Democrats
Party of Free Democrats (Ukraine)
The Free Democrats (Denmark)
The Free Democrats (Denmark, historical)
Union of Free Democrats (Bulgaria)
Free Democratic Party (Germany)
Free Democrats Ireland (Ireland)

See also
Free Democratic Party (disambiguation)